Alicia Ortuño (born 2 May 1976) is a former professional tennis player from Spain. From 1990 to 2001, she won 30 titles on the ITF Women's Circuit, and one doubles title on the WTA Tour. She appeared in six Grand Slam events.

Career highlights
On 1 November 1999, Ortuño reached her highest doubles ranking of world No. 82. Her highest singles ranking came on 20 July 1998, when she became world No. 155.

In 1994, Ortuño partnered with Cristina Torrens Valero to win her first ITF doubles title in the $25k Barcelona tournament. In 1999, Ortuño and Torrens-Valero partnered again to win the doubles title of the WTA Tour Estoril Open.

Grand Slam appearances
From 1996–1999, Ortuño competed in six Grand Slam tournaments: twice at the Australian Open, once at the French Open, once at Wimbledon and twice at the US Open.

WTA career finals

Doubles: 1 (1 title)

ITF Circuit finals

Singles: 10 (6–4)

Doubles: 38 (24–14)

References

External links
 
 

Living people
1976 births
Spanish female tennis players
Sportswomen from Catalonia
Tennis players from Barcelona